Udelno-Duvaney (Udelno-Dıwanay) is a rural locality (a selo) and the administrative centre of Udelno-Duvaneysky Selsoviet, Blagoveshchensky District, Bashkortostan, Russia. The population was 1,079 as of 2010. There are 27 streets.

Geography 
Udelno-Duvaney is located on the right bank of the Belaya River, 19 km north of Blagoveshchensk (the district's administrative centre) by road. Ilyinsky is the nearest rural locality.

References 

Rural localities in Blagoveshchensky District